James William Ross (born January 3, 1952) is an American professional wrestling commentator currently signed with All Elite Wrestling (AEW) as a commentator, analyst, and senior advisor.  Ross is best known for a long and distinguished career as a play-by-play commentator for the WWE. He is known affectionately as JR or Good Ol' JR. Ross has been labeled as one of the greatest wrestling commentators of all time.

After years of working various jobs in the professional wrestling industry, Ross became the primary play-by-play announcer for Mid-South Wrestling in the early 1980s. He went on to do commentary for the National Wrestling Alliance and World Championship Wrestling, before jumping to the World Wrestling Federation (WWF, now WWE), making his first appearance for the promotion at WrestleMania IX in 1993. During his tenure with WWE, Ross was widely regarded as the voice of the company, particularly during the Attitude Era of the late 1990s and early 2000s. He was also the lead announcer for New Japan Pro-Wrestling (NJPW) on AXS TV from 2015 to 2018 and occasionally does play-by-play for boxing and mixed martial arts. He has been inducted into the WWE, NWA and Wrestling Observer Newsletter halls of fame, and has been honored by the George Tragos/Lou Thesz Professional Wrestling Hall of Fame twice.

Outside of wrestling, Ross is known for his barbecue sauce and beef jerky brand, J.R.'s Family BBQ. He also hosts his own weekly podcast, Grilling JR.

Early life
James William Ross was born on January 3, 1952, in Fort Bragg, California. While attending Westville High School, Ross played first base on the Westville baseball team. Ross was a two-time all-conference football player for the Westville Yellowjackets in 1968–69. His maternal grandparents owned a general store in Westville, Oklahoma and his paternal grandfather, Dee Ross, owned an off-sale beer store and was a carpenter. Ross was also President of the Student Body, a 4-year letterman in basketball, and State Vice President of the Future Farmers of America (FFA). He was the FFA Oklahoma Speech Champion in 1968 and 1969 and runner up for the FFA National Speech Championship in 1969. He was awarded the FFA State Degree in 1970, the organization's second highest award. He ran for and was elected vice president of the FFA Northeast District in 1970. Ross was also named Honorable Mention on the 1969 High School All-State Football team by the Tulsa World as a center.

In high school, Ross did well academically, reaching the National Honor Society his sophomore year. He received an award for maintaining a 3.6 grade point average his junior year. In 1969, Ross was nominated by Representative Wiley Sparkman to serve as a page for the Oklahoma House of Representatives. That year, Ross served as the treasurer for Oklahoma Boys State. For 18 years, Ross officiated high school and college baseball, football and basketball games in Oklahoma.

Broadcasting career

Professional wrestling

NWA Tri-State/Mid-South Wrestling/Universal Wrestling Federation (1974–1987)
During his tenure at Northeastern State University, Ross had spent some time commentating on college radio. With this experience, Ross was given the opportunity to fill a broadcast position in the local NWA Tri-State territory, after an announcer was unable to appear at one of the territory's events. After his arrival in the promotion, Ross first worked as a referee starting in 1974. Ross remained as a referee until 1977 when he then transitioned to the promotion's broadcast team. After Bill Watts' purchase of NWA Tri-State in 1982 and the subsequent re-branding to Mid-South Wrestling (MSW), Ross was promoted to the promotion's lead play-by-play position and also became Mid-South Vice President of Marketing. During this time, Ross was able to call his very first NWA World Heavyweight Championship match which featured Ric Flair and Ted DiBiase.

Jim Crockett Promotions/World Championship Wrestling (1987–1993)
When Jim Crockett, Jr. bought the Universal Wrestling Federation (UWF) and merged it with his Jim Crockett Promotions (JCP) group, Ross joined JCP and began doing color commentary alongside David Crockett and Tony Schiavone. With his new position, Ross became the head play-by-play man for the National Wrestling Alliance. Ross continued to hone his skills as JCP became World Championship Wrestling (WCW), following the purchase of the regional promotion by Ted Turner. In 1991, WCW left the NWA and Ross was teamed with former NWA broadcaster Bob Caudle. In 1992, he also spent one season as a commentator on the Atlanta Falcons radio broadcasts.

Ross worked his way up the WCW ladder to become head of broadcasting, but had a contentious relationship with WCW's newest commentator and future executive Eric Bischoff. According to Ross, Bischoff, who reported to him, did a really good job of "selling himself" to executives of WCW's owner Turner Broadcasting. According to Bischoff, Ross mistreated him and others (mostly in deference to Ross's then-supervisor Bill Watts), and when Bischoff was promoted to executive producer in 1993, Ross demanded and received his release.

Ross had a three-year contract with Turner Broadcasting, but he took an immediate buy-out for fear that he would not get work elsewhere due to being taken off television for a long period of time. Mick Foley claims that Ross resigned from WCW's booking committee. Ross left WCW after being taken off the air by Bischoff.

World Wrestling Federation/Entertainment/WWE (1993–1994, 1994–2013)

Ross was hired by the World Wrestling Federation and made his on-screen debut at WrestleMania IX at a specially constructed outdoor venue at Caesar's Palace on the Las Vegas Strip. He took over for Gorilla Monsoon on WWE Wrestling Challenge the following weekend. Ross worked alongside Bobby Heenan on the show until Heenan left the WWE in December 1993. Ross was originally the main voice of the WWE's pay-per-view events when he was first brought in, calling both WrestleMania IX and the King of the Ring with Heenan and Randy Savage in 1993. Vince McMahon took over his position at pay-per-views starting with SummerSlam 1993.

Ross suggested the idea of Radio WWF to McMahon, the idea was given a try and Ross was made host alongside Monsoon. In this role, Ross was joined by co-hosts such as Johnny Polo, and talked to various WWF wrestlers and fans. Ross and Monsoon called SummerSlam and Survivor Series at the end of 1993 and the Royal Rumble for Radio WWF.

Ross was fired on February 11, 1994, two weeks after suffering his first attack of Bell's palsy on January 30, 1994, as stated by Ross on the September 23, 1996 episode of Raw. He subsequently became an announcer for Smoky Mountain Wrestling and the NFL's Atlanta Falcons (the second time he was with the Falcons as an announcer). In Smoky Mountain Wrestling, Ross was reunited with former NWA/WCW announcer Bob Caudle. The promotion was owned by longtime NWA Manager Jim Cornette and featured many former NWA/WCW wrestlers such as The Rock 'n' Roll Express, Eddie Gilbert, and "Dr. Death" Steve Williams.

When Vince McMahon was indicted by the United States federal government in 1994, he was unable to continue commentating on WWF Monday Night Raw. After a few weeks of Gorilla Monsoon on play-by-play, the WWF rehired Ross to fill in for McMahon alongside Randy Savage throughout that summer. After McMahon was acquitted, Ross was let go by the WWF for leaking inside information to journalists. Ross briefly returned to Smoky Mountain Wrestling. The WWF rehired him once again in December 1994. Relegated to the syndicated WWF programming for the majority of the next two years, Ross rejoined the primary announce team in the summer of 1996. In September 1996, Ross turned heel in WWF storylines for the first time in his career. Following Scott Hall and Kevin Nash's departure from the WWF for World Championship Wrestling and their debut there as The Outsiders, Ross began to proclaim on television that he was still in touch with Razor Ramon and Diesel (Hall and Nash's WWF personas, respectively) and claimed that he would be bringing them back to the WWF soon. Other announcers were skeptical, and WWF President Gorilla Monsoon said that Hall and Nash were under contract with "another organization", and ordered Ross to cease and desist mentioning them on the air. On the September 23, 1996 episode of Monday Night Raw, Ross delivered a worked-shoot promo during which he ran down WWF Chairman Vince McMahon (outing him as chairman and not just a commentator for the first time in WWF storylines) and debuted his "new" Diesel and Razor, claiming that while working in the WWF "front office" he had been the man responsible for so many people leaving the company as part of his "revenge" against the WWF for how they treated him in the past. While he was kept on the air by McMahon, Ross portrayed himself to be bitter and spiteful, with repeated potshots at McMahon. However, the "New Diesel-New Razor" storyline was poorly received by fans, and Ross's heel turn was quickly dropped.

After this angle, Ross went on to host various WWF programs such as Superstars, Action Zone, Raw Is War, and Shotgun Saturday Night. At the end of 1998, Ross took a break from Raw Is War, due to another attack of Bell's Palsy he suffered whilst broadcasting a PPV (Capital Carnage) in London, England. Earlier in the day Ross had been informed his mother had died. On March 8, 1999, he returned to Raw Is War as part of a storyline alleging that McMahon fired him because of his condition, but that he would not go down quietly and enlisted the services of "Dr. Death" Steve Williams as his personal "enforcer". Ross confronted his replacement, Michael Cole, in the ring. Despite Cole's insistence that he was not trying to steal Ross's job, Ross kicked Cole in the crotch and attempted to return to the announce table, though Terry Taylor ended up commentating for the rest of the night. The narrative went as far as to have Ross set up his own announce table in front of the official announce table labeled "JR Is Raw". The storyline was soon dropped as the attempt to turn Ross heel failed (the fans ended up cheering Ross and booing Cole) and he took his seat back as "official" commentator of Raw Is War starting with the main event of WrestleMania XV. Ross's Bell's palsy proved fodder for ridicule by WWF's competitor, World Championship Wrestling, in late 1999. Ed Ferrara parodied Ross, including doing a full impression including mockery of his modified voice due to his medical condition. This was received negatively by fans and wrestlers alike. Ferrara ceased mocking the medical condition after the first week due to Turner Standards and Practices stepping in and overriding Vince Russo. The angle was soon dropped by WCW, but not before "Oklahoma", Ferrara's parody of JR, won the WCW Cruiserweight Championship. Though Ross was offended over the gimmick, he doesn't fault Ferrara himself over the gimmick and Ross & Ferrara have since patched things up over the angle.

During this time, Ross was commissioned to announce regional telecasts of the XFL, a professional football league co-owned by WWF. Ross, who had experience announcing for the Atlanta Falcons, was initially placed on the regional broadcasts, with his WWF partner Jerry Lawler as color commentator, even though Lawler admitted knowing and caring little about the sport, for the first regional telecast. After an incident in which the head play-by-play man on the national broadcast team, Matt Vasgersian, openly criticized the production on-air, Ross was hastily promoted to lead play-by-play, with Jesse Ventura as color commentator, for the next four weeks of broadcasts. Ross returned to the regional telecasts halfway through the XFL's Longhorns lone season, with Dick Butkus as his color commentator after Lawler left the company.

Ross was the "voice of Raw Is War" throughout the Monday Night Wars alongside Jerry Lawler and cemented his legacy as one of the great wrestling commentators as WWE became the sole major wrestling promotion in North America. After the WWE Brand Extension, Ross worked exclusively for the Raw brand, cutting down to doing play-by-play on Raw-only pay-per-views, while SmackDown!-only pay-per-views were announced by SmackDown!'s announce team.

JR was involved in a lengthy feud with Eric Bischoff over the latter's mistreatment of Stone Cold Steve Austin. Also during this time, Ross served as an Executive Vice President of Talent Relations for the WWF/WWE, a codified extension of his long-time backstage role as a key individual in charge of hiring new talent. By 2005, Ross had stepped down from his executive and management roles. According to repeated statements on his official blog, the move away from management proved beneficial in terms of decreased work-load, giving him more time to focus on his health, his family, and his entrepreneurial endeavors.

Still working as the voice of Raw, Ross was again "fired" (kayfabe) from his play-by-play job by Vince and Linda McMahon on October 10, 2005. Doctors had discovered a serious issue with Ross's colon, and his storyline termination provided an explanation for his absence. While recovering from his colon surgery, Joey Styles (best known for his commentary work for Extreme Championship Wrestling) called the weekly Raw. After recovering, Ross helped produce the Raw announcers from backstage, and was brought back for Saturday Night's Main Event XXXII in 2006, then the Raw-brand matches at WrestleMania 22 and Backlash before taking back his play-by-play job on Raw on May 8, 2006, after Styles quit Raw in the storyline, declaring his hatred for "sports entertainment".

Ross's contract with WWE expired in October 2006. At that point, neither side had signed a new contract and instead worked week to week under the terms of the expired contract. In November 2006, Ross stated on his official blog that he had signed a new one-year contract with WWE and would continue to work year-to-year.

On March 31, 2007, Ross was inducted into the WWE Hall of Fame class of 2007 by Steve Austin.

On June 23, 2008, during the 2008 WWE Draft, Ross was drafted from Raw to the SmackDown brand while Michael Cole was drafted from SmackDown to Raw, trading positions as commentators on each brand.  This ended Ross's position as Monday Night Raws play-by-play commentator after a nearly 12-year run. The following day Ross posted a blog on his official website saying initially he was not happy with the move and considered quitting the company since he was not told beforehand about the move, but that he would work "to make SmackDown the best program the WWE produces".

On September 23, 2008, episode of ECW on Syfy, Ross made an appearance on the ECW brand filling in for a sick Todd Grisham alongside Matt Striker.

On April 8, 2009, Ross announced on his WWE Universe blog that with the departure of Tazz from World Wrestling Entertainment, he would assume the role of SmackDowns color analyst, with ECW announcer Todd Grisham moving over to the brand as the play-by-play announcer. The Hell in a Cell PPV event on October 4, 2009 was his last PPV broadcast as a full-time announcer for WWE and the SmackDown tapings on October 6, 2009 was the final televised broadcast as the full-time announcer. 

Ross missed the SmackDown tapings on October 13, 2009, as he asked for a day off due to an anniversary. Seven days later, on October 20, Ross suffered his third Bell's palsy episode en route to Columbia, South Carolina for a SmackDown taping. After initially planning on working the tapings and reuniting with Lawler, Ross instead flew back to Oklahoma, missing the show—Lawler and Cole commentated SmackDown—and leaving his plans for Bragging Rights in the air. On October 21, 2009, Jim Ross announced that he would not be commentating the WWE Bragging Rights pay-per-view, but Grisham mentioned that SmackDown would give Ross the Bragging Rights trophy as a "get well" gift.

On the November 15, 2010 Old School Raw special, Ross made a guest appearance on commentary with Jerry Lawler and Michael Cole, calling a match between Daniel Bryan and Jack Swagger. Cole insulted Ross throughout the match, which resulted in Ross hitting Cole over the head with his hat after the match had finished. Ross returned on March 14, 2011, to confront Cole, who had entered into a feud with Lawler. After being insulted by Cole, he challenged him to a match but was attacked by Swagger. Ross called the final four matches at WrestleMania XXVII, including the Cole vs Lawler match. On the post-WrestleMania Raw, Ross joined commentary, only to walk out later in the night after Cole squirted him with barbecue sauce. Ross and Lawler defeated Cole and Swagger on the April 11 and 25 episodes of Raw but were defeated by Cole and Swagger in a Country Whipping match at Extreme Rules. As Lawler's feud with Cole ended at Over the Limit, Ross showed up to gain revenge on Cole by squirting him with barbecue sauce.

On July 25, 2011, the new COO of WWE, Triple H re-hired Ross to a full-time commentating position on Raw. The new Raw Interim General Manager, John Laurinaitis, fired Ross on October 10 for walking out on Triple H a week earlier. Ross later revealed that he was given no prior notice that he was to be publicly fired. Ross returned on October 17, joining John Cena to defeat Michael Cole and Alberto Del Rio in a tag match. A week later, Cole challenged Ross to a "Michael Cole Challenge", with Ross's job on the line. The challenge took place on November 14; Ross won two of the three challenges, the first being an arm wrestling contest, and the second being a dance off, but lost the final challenge, which was who weighed less. Even though he lost the contest, he called the opening match of the night after Michael Cole was attacked by CM Punk.

At WrestleMania XXVIII, he returned to call the 'End of an Era' Hell in a Cell match between Triple H and The Undertaker. Prior to the start of the match, Ross shook hands with Michael Cole, effectively healing any old wounds they had between them. Ross also made an appearance at Raw 1000, commentating the opening match. On June 20, 2012, Ross took over as a commentator on the revamped NXT alongside Byron Saxton and William Regal. Also during 2012, after Paul Levesque (Triple H) took control of Talent Relations he hired Jim Ross to work as an Adviser and Scout within the department. Following Jerry Lawler's heart attack on September 10, 2012, Ross returned to Raw to work as an interim commentator while Lawler recovered. Ross was honored on the October 1 edition of Raw as it was dedicated JR Appreciation Night and was held in his hometown of Oklahoma City.  While CM Punk interrupted the segment as it aired, Ross was acknowledged by Vince McMahon and Triple H as well as local wrestling legends Bill Watts and Danny Hodge after Raw went off the air.  Ross also served as presenter for the Match of the Year award at the 2012 Slammy Awards.

In 2013, Ross began to coach and produce new announcers at the WWE Performance Center in Florida. He returned to television on the 20th Anniversary edition of Raw on January 14, 2013, where he called the steel cage main event between John Cena and Dolph Ziggler.  On March 1, 2013, he appeared on WWE Smackdown to interview his long-time friend Jack Swagger, and Swagger's new advocate, Zeb Colter. During the segment, Swagger turned against Ross, ending their friendship.

On August 16, 2013, while hosting a WWE 2K14 roster announcement panel with guests, Ross was suspected of being intoxicated. He used profanity during several points and appeared to have little to no interest in the topics that were scheduled to be covered. He also put down one of the sponsors of the event and allowed Ric Flair, who was a member of the guest panel and was also suspected of being intoxicated, to share a slew of off-color remarks and stories, among them being a description of John Cena as a "hardcore drinker." On September 11, 2013, Ross officially announced his "retirement" from WWE as his contract had expired and was not to be renewed, however it was suspected that he was fired due to his actions at the roster announcement. In an interview in 2014, Ross claimed that an insult to the sponsor of the event was what led to his release. In the same interview he confirmed that he was not drunk, but rather fatigued due to Bell's palsy which was likely the reason he may have been perceived as being intoxicated. McMahon addressed the situation in a December 2014 interview, claiming that while he disapproved of Ross's behavior at the event, it was ultimately Ross's decision to leave WWE as he wanted to spend more time at home than working for WWE. McMahon stated that there is no heat between the two parties.

New Japan Pro-Wrestling (2015–2018)
On January 4, 2015, Ross and Matt Striker served as the English language commentators for Global Force Wrestling's presentation of New Japan Pro-Wrestling's Wrestle Kingdom 9 in Tokyo Dome pay-per-view.

On January 19, 2016, it was announced that Ross had signed to become the new lead announcer for NJPW's weekly program on AXS TV along with Josh Barnett. Ross's contract was directly with AXS TV and not NJPW. It was revealed in November 2018 that Barnett and Ross would no longer be doing NJPW commentary. In 2019 the New Japan World commentary team took over broadcasting the AXS shows until the contract ended in December of that year.

Independent circuit (2016–2019)
On October 8, 2016, Ross, along with Jim Cornette, provided commentary for What Culture Pro Wrestling's (WCPW) first iPPV, Refuse to Lose. On December 31, Ross was on commentary for the pilot episode of World of Sport Wrestling on ITV. On February 12, 2017, Ross returned to WCPW for commentary at the iPPV, True Destiny and for WCPW's Loaded tapings that same month.

Return to WWE (2017–2019)
On April 2, 2017, at WrestleMania 33, Ross returned to WWE, providing commentary for the main event No Holds Barred match between The Undertaker and Roman Reigns. Shortly after the event, it was announced that Ross had signed a two-year deal with the company. During the summer, Ross would provide commentary, alongside Lita, for the Mae Young Classic. On the January 22, 2018, episode of Raw 25 Years, Ross would reunite with Jerry Lawler as part of the commentary team that was at the Manhattan Center in which Ross was caught by several cameras sleeping. On April 8, 2018, at WrestleMania 34, Ross called the fifth annual André the Giant Memorial Battle Royal on the WrestleMania 34 pre-show, alongside Jerry Lawler and Byron Saxton. Ross's last televised appearance for WWE was part of the pre-show panel for the Greatest Royal Rumble on April 27, 2018.

Ross left the WWE on March 27, 2019, after electing not to renew his contract. Ross stated that the reason for his WWE departure was because, "I had two bookings in 2018 and they weren't using me very much". Ross also attributed that another factor in his departure was Ross stating himself that, "I still think I can do play-by-play even though others that may surround Vince think I can't ". In August 2019, Ross later revealed what he said to Vince McMahon before he left, stating "Vince, unlike you I still believe I can do it and there are other people who believe I can do it including some of your audience".

All Elite Wrestling (2019–present)
On April 3, 2019, it was announced that Ross had signed a three-year deal with All Elite Wrestling (AEW) as a commentator and senior advisor. Ross initially provided full-time commentary on the broadcast team on AEW Dynamite and occasionally part-time commentary on AEW Rampage. On the January 5, 2022 episode of Dynamite, Ross returned to TBS for the first time since 1993. In June 2022, Ross switched from full-time commentary on Dynamite to full-time commentary on Rampage in a commentary team rotation swap with Taz.

National Football League
In 1992, Ross joined the Atlanta Falcons radio broadcast team. However, he would leave after one season, but had a second stint with the Falcons in 1994.

Boxing
Ross made his debut calling boxing on May 26, 2014, for Golden Boy Promotions on Fox Sports 1.

Mixed martial arts
Ross teamed up with MMA fighter and UFC veteran Chael Sonnen to commentate the Battlegrounds MMA one night tournament PPV on October 3, 2014.

Podcasting
In February 2014 Ross began hosting his own podcast The Ross Report for PodcastOne. It was later relaunched as part of the Westwood One podcast network in 2018 as The Jim Ross Report. In April 2019, Ross partnered with wrestling podcaster/mortgage lender Conrad Thompson to revamp his podcast as Grilling JR, with a new format of reminiscences about Ross's history in wrestling, much in the same style as Thompson's podcasts with Bruce Prichard, Eric Bischoff, Tony Schiavone, 
Kurt Angle, Jeff Jarrett and Arn Anderson.

Grilling JR Episodes

In-ring career
Although Ross's career has predominantly been as a commentator, Ross has participated in matches, with some notable success, including a victory over Triple H in a no-disqualification match in 2005 (albeit with help from Batista).

Another notable in-ring appearance by Ross was in a tag team match with broadcast partner Jerry "The King" Lawler against Al Snow and Jonathan Coachman at the 2003 Unforgiven pay-per-view, with their Raw broadcast jobs on the line. They lost the contest to Snow and Coachman due to interference by Chris Jericho, however two weeks later Ross and Lawler regained their jobs when Ross defeated Coachman in a Country Whippin' match, using a stunner as a finishing maneuver. Ross has participated in more matches alongside Lawler, including a few with hardcore stipulations. In 2011, Ross competed against Michael Cole on the April 25 episode of Raw, where he defeated Cole by disqualification after Cole's manager for the match, Jack Swagger, attacked Ross while he had Cole mounted and was landing punches on him.

Ross has been involved in numerous other conflicts with other competitors as well such as Triple H, Val Venis, Jack Swagger, Vladimir Kozlov, Mankind, and Steve Austin, Ross has been bloodied in a match by then-Raw General Manager Eric Bischoff, and was even set on fire by Kane. Ross even main-evented the WWF's first-ever show from the Georgia Dome in Atlanta, Georgia, an episode of Raw is War that took place on October 11, 1999. Ross teamed with Steve Austin to take on WWF Champion Triple H and his partner Chyna.

As part of storylines, Ross has been regularly targeted by Vince McMahon in rather harsh circumstances throughout his time with WWE: most notably in 2005 when Vince McMahon's character, Mr. McMahon, featured in a series of segments which made fun of Ross's legitimate colon surgery.

In 2011, after his firing as an announcer by John Laurinaitis, he returned to team up with John Cena to face Michael Cole and Alberto Del Rio in a tag team match on Raw in a winning effort.

Personal life
Ric Flair claims he introduced Ross to his late wife, Jan. Ross writes in his autobiography that Ric Flair was present on an airplane when he first met Jan who was a flight attendant. He has two daughters from two previous marriages and two granddaughters. He cites Steve Austin and Jerry Lawler as his closest friends.
Ross lives with Bell's palsy, which sometimes temporarily paralyzes his facial muscles. The symptoms first occurred on January 30, 1994. In late 1998, following the death of his mother, Ross took a break from WWE Raw as the effects of his grief reportedly aggravated his palsy; Michael Cole filled in for him.

In 2007, encouraged by sales of his line of barbecue sauces and beef products, Ross opened up J.R.'s Family Bar-B-Q in Norman, Oklahoma. The restaurant was closed by May 2010. Ross is also a fan of Skyline Chili and has mentioned them in connection to Cincinnati numerous times on AEW programming.

Ross is an avid Oklahoma Sooners fan and a regular football season ticket holder. This is reflected in his entrance music, which is "Boomer Sooner" (the Sooners' fight song). He can be spotted at some Sooners home games, and when the Sooners play top teams around the country. In 2014, he became FoxSports.com's Contributor for NCAA Football and Oklahoma Sooners. On the February 23, 2021 episode of his YouTube series Grilling J.R., Ross stated that The Sopranos is his favorite TV show and that he still would occasionally watch it.

On March 21, 2017, Ross's wife Jan was involved in a vehicle accident, suffering serious head injuries. She was put on life support, where she died two days later.

Ross had an eye operation in 2018 that greatly affected his eyesight in one eye.

On October 23, 2021, Ross tweeted that he had skin cancer as he was on his way to AEW Dynamite. On December 29, 2021, Ross tweeted that he was cancer free.

In other media
In the film Man on the Moon, Ross played Lance Russell (Memphis weekly wrestling show's lead announcer) announcing the match between Andy Kaufman (played by Jim Carrey) and Jerry "The King" Lawler.

Ross also has a recurring role on the Amazon Prime Video original Paradise City as Ned.

Ross was one of the original lead announcers of the original XFL in spring 2001.

Ross has also provided his voice for many WWE video games, and is also a playable character in WWE '12, WWF WrestleMania 2000, WWF No Mercy and many more.

In October 2014, he appeared in "Brian and the Boz", a 30 for 30 documentary on fellow Oklahoman Brian Bosworth. Three years later, he appeared in another 30 for 30 documentary, this time about Ric Flair.

Ross has written two WWF/WWE themed cook books Can You Take The Heat? The WWF Is Cooking and J.R's Cookbook released in 2000 and 2003 respectively. 
His autobiography Slobberknocker was released on October 3, 2017. The foreword for the new autobiography was written by Vince McMahon. The book includes a letter from McMahon to Ross from when Ross was sick for the second time with Bell's Palsy. 
Ross's second book and further autobiography Under the Black Hat: My Life in the WWE and Beyond, co-written with Paul O'Brien, was published in March 2020.

Ross has also created a range of JR's BBQ sauces and mustard which have been inspired by his own culinary knowledge and that of his close family.

Legacy
Ross has been labeled as the greatest wrestling commentator of all time. Ryan Dilbert from the Bleacher Report has stated "Ross also brought searing passion and a love of the wrestling business to Mid-South Wrestling, WWE and World Championship Wrestling. To hear a match with Ross on the call was to watch wrestling morph into poetry, for the scripted action to feel real, meaningful and unforgettable. Debating the greatest pro wrestling commentator comes down to two men, Ross and Gordon Solie. As for the greatest in WWE history, there is no debate Ross stands alone".

Professional wrestling booker and promoter and colleague, Eric Bischoff, has praised and been critical of Ross, stating, "Jim was in upper-management, had a lot of influence, was participating in the booking during WCW's worst days, and he still didn't have management of the company. So I'm not saying he wasn't capable, necessarily. But he certainly didn't have a track record that he could point to and say look, this is what I did over here." Bischoff also further reiterated that Ross, "worked very closely with Bill Watts, which is one of the biggest train wrecks in the history of professional wrestling. So it's not like Jim came in with a résumé that would make one think he would be the ideal candidate to run a wrestling company. Jim is the best announcer, probably on planet Earth. Jim had a tremendous amount of experience and had seen a lot, but he'd never done it."

WWE Hall of Famer and Legend Stone Cold Steve Austin has praised Ross stating, "Jim Ross, to me, with his range, with his storytelling, he paid his dues. I mean, he learned from the ground up. And his inflection and his ability to watch a match, tell a story, get the talent over with the credibility that he had, he was the shining diamond on top of everyone, so always a good experience with Jim".

Awards and accomplishmentsCauliflower Alley ClubArt Abrams Lifetime Achievement Award (2010)George Tragos/Lou Thesz Professional Wrestling Hall of FameLou Thesz Award (2011)
Gordon Solie Award (2022)National Wrestling AllianceNWA Hall of Fame (Class of 2016)Pro Wrestling Illustrated
Stanley Weston Award (2002)
World Wrestling Entertainment/WWE
WWE Hall of Fame (Class of 2007)
Slammy Award for "Tell Me I Did Not Just See That" Moment of the Year (2011) – 
Wrestling Observer Newsletter
Best Television Announcer (1988–1993, 1998–2001, 2006–2007, 2009, 2012)
Worst Feud of the Year (2005) 
Wrestling Observer Newsletter Hall of Fame (Class of 1999)

References

Sources

External links

 
 J.R's Family Bar-B-Q
 Grilling JR on Westwood One Podcast Network
 
 
 

1952 births
21st-century American non-fiction writers
All Elite Wrestling personnel
American bloggers
American color commentators
American podcasters
Living people
People from Westville, Oklahoma
People from Fort Bragg, California
Professional wrestling announcers
Professional wrestling podcasters
Professional wrestling referees
Sportspeople from Norman, Oklahoma
WWE executives
WWE Hall of Fame inductees
XFL (2001) announcers